Enerhodar (literally 'energy giver') is a city and municipality in the north-western part of the Zaporizhzhia Oblast in Ukraine, currently under the control of the Russian Armed Forces. It is on the south bank of the Dnieper River, on the opposite side of the Kakhovka Reservoir from Nikopol and Chervonohryhorivka. Its main industry is electricity generation, at a coal-fired power station and a large nuclear power station. In 2022 its population was  about 11,000 of whom work at the nuclear power station.

History
Enerhodar was founded on 12 June 1970 for building and serving the Zaporizhzhia thermal power station. It obtained city status by 1985, while part of the Ukrainian Soviet Socialist Republic of the Soviet Union. Zaporizhzhia Nuclear Power Plant, the largest nuclear power plant in Europe, was built there in the 1980s (construction of the building began in 1980, and its first unit was commissioned in late 1985). In 1991, the city became part of independent Ukraine.

The city's two power plants continue to be major employers for its inhabitants into the 21st century.

Russo-Ukrainian War 

On 28 February 2022, Russia claimed to have captured the city and the nuclear power plant. The mayor of Enerhodar, Dmytro Orlov, denied the claim. 

Civilians built a large barricade of sandbags and vehicles on the road to the nuclear power plant in an attempt to hinder Russian troop advancement. The Ukrainian military administration for the southeast confirmed on 7 March that Enerhodar had been occupied by Russian forces.

Points of interest 
 Enerhodar Dnipro Powerline Crossing
 Zaporizhzhia Nuclear Power Plant
 Zaporizhzhia thermal power station (Zaporizhzhia DRES)

Gallery

References

External links 

 Official municipality site 
 Enerhodar portal
 Enerhodar, Ukraine — statistics

Cities in Zaporizhzhia Oblast
Populated places established in the Ukrainian Soviet Socialist Republic
Populated places established in 1970
Cities of regional significance in Ukraine
Populated places on the Dnieper in Ukraine
Company towns in Ukraine
Populated places of Kakhovka Reservoir
1970 establishments in Ukraine
Socialist planned cities
Territorial disputes of Ukraine